The 1907 University of New Mexico football team was an American football team represented the University of New Mexico as an independent during the 1907 college football season. In its third and final season under head coach Martin F. Angell, the team compiled a 1–0 record, defeating the Albuquerque Indian School by a score of 44 to 0. Walter R. Allen was the team captain.

The season ended early in order to allow the team to devote more time to its studies.

Schedule

References

University of New Mexico
New Mexico Lobos football seasons
College football undefeated seasons
University of New Mexico football